Below is a list of stingless bees of Brazil from Pedro (2014).

A total of 244 species belonging to 89 genera are found in Brazil.

List of species

List of genera

See also
Wildlife of Brazil

Bibliography

Posey, Darrell A. 1986. Etnoentomologia de tribos indígenas da Amazônia. In: Ribeiro, Darcy (editor); Ribeiro, Berta G. (coord.). Suma Etnológica Brasileira, Vol. 1: Etnobiologia, p. 95-99. Petrópolis: Vozes, Finep.

References

 
 
 
Bees
Brazil
Brazil